Tabuda, Thouda or  Tahuda (former Roman Thabudeos) was a Roman–Berber colonia in the province of Numidia. A key town in the Roman, Byzantine and Vandal empires, it is identifiable with the stone ruins at the oasis adjacent to the village of Sidi Okba, Algeria.

Bishopric
The Diocese of Tabuda (Tabudensis) is a suppressed and titular see of the Roman Catholic Church in the province of Numidia.

Known Bishops
Laurent Tétrault,  (13 Nov 1947 Appointed – 14 Mar 1951 Died) 
Teodor Bensch (26 Apr 1951 Appointed – 1 Dec 1956) 
Antonio Añoveros Ataún † (25 Aug 1952 Appointed – 2 Apr 1964) 
Teodor Bensch † (21 Sep 1954 Ordained Bishop – 1 Dec 1956) 
James Louis Flaherty † (8 Aug 1966 Appointed – 9 Aug 1975) 
Giovanni Innocenzo Martinelli, O.F.M. (3 May 1985 – 30 Dec 2019)
Elias Richard Lorenzo, O.S.B. (27 Feb 2020 - )

References

Bibliography 
 Pierre Morizot, Regard sur les inscriptions de Thouda du XVIIIe siècle à nos jours, Volume 154, Issue 2, Feb 2016

External Links 

 Images of the Tabuda (Thouda) site in the Manar al-Athar digital photo archive resource

Roman towns and cities in Mauretania Caesariensis
7th-century disestablishments in the Exarchate of Africa
Archaeological sites in Algeria
Catholic titular sees in Africa